Freddie Stone (born Frederick Jerome Stewart, June 5, 1947) is an American pastor and musician, best known as a co-founder, guitarist, and vocalist in the band Sly and the Family Stone, fronted by his brother Sly and including his sister Rose. He was inducted into the Rock and Roll Hall of Fame in 1993 as a member of Sly and the Family Stone.

After leaving the band in the late 1970s, Stone signed a short recording contract with Motown Records.

Personal life

His childhood years were spent in Vallejo, California. His parents were Christians and they attended the Pentecostal church. They also were musicians with his father playing violin, harp and guitar and his mother playing guitar as well as piano. His early years were spent at church and without racial inhibition. His mother would babysit the children in the neighborhood who happened to be of all colors. He started playing music when he was twelve.

As a result of fighting at Vallejo High School, he was expelled and had to attend Benicia High School. He did quite well there and in his junior year he was MVP on his basketball team.  In his senior year he was President of the student body. Not long after he graduated, the Stewart family along with Freddie moved to San Francisco.

Ministry
According to a 2009 KCRW interview with Sly Stone, Freddie has been, since 1994, Pastor Frederick Stewart, a preacher in his native Vallejo. He became a committed Christian in 1980 and in 1988 he was ordained as a pastor. Over a period of time he was being prepared to take over his uncle's church, the Evangelist Temple Fellowship Center, of which he is currently Pastor. The church is located on Sonoma Boulevard in Vallejo, California.

Releases

 Everywhere You Are - Geronimo Inc / Orchard - (2001) 
 Right Now - (2012) (Updated version of Everywhere You Are)
Steadfast - (2019)

References

1947 births
American funk guitarists
American rock guitarists
American soul guitarists
American male guitarists
Lead guitarists
Living people
Musicians from Vallejo, California
Sly and the Family Stone members
African-American rock musicians
Members of the Church of God in Christ
American Christian clergy
American rhythm and blues guitarists
American soul singers
American rhythm and blues singers
American funk singers
Guitarists from California
20th-century American guitarists
African-American guitarists
21st-century African-American male singers
20th-century African-American male singers